The 39th parallel south is a circle of latitude that is 39 degrees south of the Earth's equatorial plane. It crosses the Atlantic Ocean, the Indian Ocean, Australasia, the Pacific Ocean and South America.

Daylight along the 39th parallel south falls under 10 hours a day starting on 17 May and returns to over ten hours a day beginning 29 July. Crops and other plant growth is considerably slowed during this period of reduced sunlight.

Around the world
Starting at the Prime Meridian and heading eastwards, the parallel 39° south passes through:

{| class="wikitable plainrowheaders"
! scope="col" width="125" | Co-ordinates
! scope="col" | Country, territory or ocean
! scope="col" | Notes
|-
| style="background:#b0e0e6;" | 
! scope="row" style="background:#b0e0e6;" | Atlantic Ocean
| style="background:#b0e0e6;" |
|-
| style="background:#b0e0e6;" | 
! scope="row" style="background:#b0e0e6;" | Indian Ocean
| style="background:#b0e0e6;" | Passing just south of Île Saint-Paul, 
|-
| style="background:#b0e0e6;" | 
! scope="row" style="background:#b0e0e6;" | Indian Ocean
| style="background:#b0e0e6;" | Bass Strait
|-
| 
! scope="row" | 
| Victoria - Wilsons Promontory
|-
| style="background:#b0e0e6;" | 
! scope="row" style="background:#b0e0e6;" | Pacific Ocean
| style="background:#b0e0e6;" | Tasman Sea
|-
| 
! scope="row" | 
| Taranaki region – passing through WaitaraManawatu-Whanganui regionWaikato region – passing just south of TurangiBay of Plenty region – for about Hawke's Bay region
|-
| style="background:#b0e0e6;" | 
! scope="row" style="background:#b0e0e6;" | Pacific Ocean
| style="background:#b0e0e6;" |
|-
| 
! scope="row" | 
| Araucanía Region – passing through Teodoro Schmidt and Sollipulli Volcano
|-
| 
! scope="row" | 
| Neuquén ProvinceRío Negro Province – passing through General Roca (at ) La Pampa ProvinceBuenos Aires Province – passing through Bahía Blanca (at )
|-
| style="background:#b0e0e6;" | 
! scope="row" style="background:#b0e0e6;" | Atlantic Ocean
| style="background:#b0e0e6;" |
|}

See also
38th parallel south
40th parallel south

s39